Soperville is an unincorporated community located in Knox County, Illinois.
Soperville is an immigrant community with ethnicity from countries including Europe, Ireland, and Sweden.

References

Unincorporated communities in Knox County, Illinois